The NAB Rising Star award is given annually to a standout young player in the Australian Football League. This was the first time the winner was presented with the Ron Evans medal, with it being awarded annually since. The 2007 winner was Joel Selwood of the Geelong Football Club.

Eligibility
Every round, an Australian Football League rising star nomination is given to a standout young player. To be eligible for the award, a player must be under 21 on 1 January of that year, have played 10 or fewer senior games and not been suspended during the season. At the end of the year, one of the 22 nominees is the winner of award.

Nominations

Final voting

References

Afl Rising Star, 2007
Rising Star
Australian rules football-related lists